Secret Removers is a Channel 4 show in which each episode is centred on one family about to move home. One member of the family is unaware that the Secret Removers are going to take over the move and will also decorate some of the new property. The unsuspecting spouse or partner is taken away on a surprise break and while they are away they are moved into the new house but not all of their objects will accompany them as some could be sold by the team.

External links
Secret Removers

2012 British television series debuts
Channel 4 original programming